Qutqashen Sultanate also known as Qabala mahaly was feudal state which existed from the middle to the end of 18th century in the north of Azerbaijan, in the territories covering the present day Qabala Rayon.

Historical background
Qabala was ancient capital of the Caucasian Albania. Archeological evidence indicates that the city functioned as the capital of the Caucasian Albania as early as the 4th century BC. Ruins of the ancient town are in 15 km from regional center, allocated on the territory between Garachay and Jourluchay rivers. Qabala was located in the middle of the 2500 old Silk Road and was mentioned in works of Pliny the Younger as "Kabalaka", Greek geographer Ptolemy as "Khabala", Arabic historian Ahmad ibn Yahya al-Baladhuri as "Khazar". In the 19th century, the Azerbaijani historian Abbasgulu Bakikhanov mentioned in his book "Gulistani Irem" that Kbala or Khabala were in fact Qabala.
In 60s B.C., Roman troops attacked Caucasian Albania but did not succeed in capturing the Qabala territory. In 262, Caucasian Albania was occupied by Sassanid Empire but preserved its political and economic status. In 464 AD, lost its independence due to years of invasions from the northern nomadic tribes and had to move its capital city to Partava (currently Barda in Azerbaijan). Qabala was occupied by Shirvanshah Fariburz, Georgian tsar David III of Tao in 1120, Mongol khan Timurleng in 1386, Safavid shah Tahmasib I in 1538, Persian Nader Shah in 1734 but was able to preserve its culture and identity. After the death of Nader Shah in 1747, Azerbaijan split into independent khanates and sultanates and Qabala became a sultanate. It was also called Qabala Mahali. After Azerbaijan was occupied by Russian Empire in 1813 it conducted administrative reforms and in 1841 Azerbaijani khanates were terminated and the territories were incorporated into governorates. Qabala sultanate was abolished and area was added to Nukha uyezd of Elisabethpol Governorate. Due to archeological finds in Qabala, it was declared a National State Reserve in 1985.

Azerbaijani writer and Imperial Russian general Ismayil bek Kutkashensky was a descendant of Qutqashen Sultans.

Rulers of the sultanate
Haji Safi Sultan
Kalbali Sultan, ruled until 1779
Haji Nasrullah

Picture gallery

See also
Khanates of the Caucasus
Qabala

References

18th century in Azerbaijan
Former sultanates
Turkic dynasties